Newman Smith High School is a public high school in Carrollton, Texas, United States in the Carrollton-Farmers Branch Independent School District. The school opened in 1975, and is named after the former CFBISD superintendent Newman Smith. Smith High School serves sections of Carrollton and Dallas. In 2015, the school was rated "Met Standard" by the Texas Education Agency.

History
In the 1970s, enrollment at R.L. Turner High School had passed 3,000 students, so a site near Josey Lane and Jackson Road was acquired for a second campus. The new facility opened in the fall of 1975, housing eighth and ninth grade students living north of Belt Line Road. During the second year, the school housed ninth and tenth grade students. The third year the school housed eighth through eleventh grade. And the fourth year, the school housed eighth through twelfth grade students. The first graduating class was 1979, with students attending four years, and the class of 1980 had attended five years.

In 1981 the eighth grade classes were moved to the newly completed North Carrollton Junior High School (now Dan F. Long Middle School) and an auditorium and second cafeteria were added. Newman Smith's student population grew rapidly in the 1980s and 1990s as new housing developments were built in north area of Carrollton. To relieve the overcrowding, Smith's boundaries were adjusted in 1988, moving approximately five-hundred students who lived south of Jackson and Keller Springs roads back to R.L. Turner, which had excess capacity at the time.

By the mid-1990s enrollment at Newman Smith was nearing 3,000 students and construction began on Creekview High School, the district's third. It was opened in the fall of 1998 and Smith's southern attendance boundary was moved back to Belt Line Road. The northern boundary was set along the newly opened President George Bush Turnpike. Today, Newman Smith High School serves all students from Ted Polk Middle School, as well as some students from DeWitt Perry and Dan F. Long Middle Schools.

Newman Smith also admits any students within the district if they would like to join the International Business Academy.

Achievements
In 1998, Newman Smith High School was selected as a United States Department of Education New American High School and Blue Ribbon School of Excellence.

Marching band 

The Trojan Band advanced to UIL State competition in 2000, 2009, 2011, and 2013 with the '09 and '11 groups becoming the first in school history to achieve this feat back to back. The 2000 Trojan Band was a state alternate in 5A competition. In 2009, the band won 1st in the 4A UIL Area B competition to qualify for State, then made finals at State with a record 3rd-place finish in prelims. They were named the 6th best 4A band in Texas after the final round, the only top ten finish for the Trojan Band to date. In 2011 the band was named the 14th best 4A band in the state after finishing 4th in Area B. In 2013, the band finished 2nd at Area B in an upset finish to qualify for UIL State, and only missed finals by one place, becoming the 11th best 4A band in Texas.

Sports
Newman Smith switched from class 5A to 4A in 2008 due to a school population decrease. In 2013, the classification system was changed and Smith became class 5A again.

Notable alumni
Anthony Armstrong - professional football player.
Andrew Brown - professional baseball player.
Preston Claiborne - professional baseball player.
Jason Maxiell - professional basketball player.
Courtney Okolo: Olympic track and field gold medalist.
Brian Watts - professional golfer.

References

External links
Official website

Public high schools in Texas
Educational institutions established in 1975
Public high schools in Dallas County, Texas
Schools in Carrollton, Texas
Carrollton-Farmers Branch Independent School District high schools